The 2008 World Running Target Championships were separate ISSF World Shooting Championships held in Plzeň, the Czech Republic, in October 2008 as a replacement for the lost Olympic status of 10 metre running target. Apart from this event, competitions were also held in 10 metre running target mixed, 50 metre running target and 50 metre running target mixed. The men's and women's regular 10 metre competitions featured the new semifinal and final stages known as medal matches.

Most of the top European shooters, which constitute the majority of the worldwide elite in running target, were present. No shooters from the most successful non-European nation, China, were competing. Russia and Ukraine dominated, winning 19 medals each.

Schedule

Medal table

Results

Men's medal match

Women's medal match

External links
 ISSF website on the competition
 Results

References

World Running Target Championships
World Championships
Sport in Plzeň
S
2008 in Czech sport
Shooting competitions in the Czech Republic